Oscar Fitzalan Long  (June 16, 1852 – December 23, 1928) was a United States Army Brigadier General who was a recipient of the Medal of Honor for valor in action on September 30, 1877 near Bear Paw Mountain, Montana. An 1876 graduate of West Point, he served in the Army until 1904.

Education and American Indian Wars
Long was born in Utica, New York in 1852. He received an appointment to West Point, graduating in 1876. He served most of his Army career in the American West.  During the campaign against Chief Joseph of the Nez Perce in the fall of 1877, Long was one of nine men who received the Medal of Honor for valor at the Battle of Bear Paw Mountain.

Medal of Honor citation
Rank and organization: Second Lieutenant, 5th U.S. Infantry. Place and date: At Bear Paw Mountain, Mont., 30 September 1877. Entered service at: Utica, N.Y. Born: 16 June 1852, Utica, N.Y. Date of issue: 22 March 1895.

Citation:

"Having been directed to order a troop of cavalry to advance, and finding both its officers killed, he voluntarily assumed command, and under a heavy fire from the Indians advanced the troop to its proper position."

Personal life
Long married Amy Requa, sister of Mark L. Requa, on October 7, 1896.

Later life and death
After retiring as a Brigadier General in 1904, Long moved to Oakland, California and became a businessman.  He was a member of the Sons of the American Revolution.  He has a collection of papers on file at the University of California, Berkeley. Long is buried at Mountain View Cemetery in Oakland.

References

1852 births
1928 deaths
United States Army Medal of Honor recipients
Military personnel from Utica, New York
United States Army generals
United States Military Academy alumni
American Indian Wars recipients of the Medal of Honor
Sons of the American Revolution
Burials at Mountain View Cemetery (Oakland, California)